The 2022–23 Vermont Catamounts men's basketball team represented the University of Vermont in the 2022–23 NCAA Division I men's basketball season. The Catamounts, led by 12th-year head coach John Becker, played their home games at the Patrick Gym in Burlington, Vermont as members of the America East Conference.

Previous season
The Catamounts finished the 2021–22 season 28–6, 17–1 in America East play to finish as regular season champions. They defeated NJIT, Binghamton, and UMBC to win the America East tournament. As a result, they received the conference's automatic bid to the NCAA tournament as the No. 13 seed in the West Region, where they lost in the first round to Arkansas.

This was to be the team's last season at Patrick Gym, but their new arena, Tarrant Event Center, was put on indefinite hold, due to a combination of the COVID-19 pandemic and rising borrowing costs.

Roster

Schedule and results

|-
!colspan=12 style=| Exhibition

|-
!colspan=12 style=| Non-conference regular season

|-
!colspan=12 style=| America East Conference regular season

|-
!colspan=12 style=| America East tournament

 
|-
!colspan=12 style=| NCAA tournament

Sources

References

Vermont Catamounts men's basketball seasons
Vermont Catamounts
Vermont Catamounts men's basketball
Vermont Catamounts men's basketball
Vermont